Brightness is the polar opposite of darkness.

Brightness may also refer to:

Scientific and Social

Brightness (civilizational), the term in scientific, philosophy, religion, poetry or artistic
Luminosity
Brightness temperature
Surface Brightness

Artistic
The Brightness, the third album by American folksinger Anais Mitchell

See also
Bright (disambiguation)
Light
Guangming (disambiguation)